Reiner Alvey Castro Barrera (born 10 January 1994) is a Venezuelan footballer that currently plays for the Primera B de Chile club Deportes Temuco as forward.

He was loaned to Santiago Wanderers from Caracas FC in 2018.

References

External links
 Reiner Castro at Football Lineups
 

1994 births
Living people
Venezuelan footballers
Venezuelan expatriate footballers
Venezuelan Primera División players
Caracas FC players
Santiago Wanderers footballers
Primera B de Chile players
Expatriate footballers in Chile
Association football forwards
Venezuelan expatriate sportspeople in Chile